The fourth season of The Real Housewives of New York City, an American reality television series, is broadcast on Bravo. It aired April 7, 2011 until August 1, 2011, and is primarily filmed in New York City, New York. Its executive producers are Andrew Hoegl, Barrie Bernstein, Lisa Shannon, Pam Healy and Andy Cohen.

The Real Housewives of New York City focuses on the lives of LuAnn de Lesseps, Alex McCord, Ramona Singer, Jill Zarin, Kelly Killoren Bensimon, Sonja Morgan and Cindy Barshop. It consisted of 18 episodes.

This season marked the final appearance of original housewife Alex McCord.

Production and crew
The Real Housewives of New York was a continued successes for the network with season three averaging 2.02 million total viewers as well as growing every season to new series highs since its spring 2008 premiere. In August 2010, the series was renewed for a fourth season with filming beginning September 20, 2010. The premiere date for season four of The Real Housewives of New York City was revealed in December 2010 for a February 14, 2011 premiere but was bumped to spring due to the premiere of The Real Housewives of Miami. In January 2011, the new premiere date for the season for was released.

The season premiere "Grin and Bare It" was aired on April 7, 2011, while the sixteenth episode "L.O.V.E. Duel" served as the season finale, and was aired on July 21, 2011.
It was followed by a two-part reunion that aired on July 25, and August 1, 2011, which marked the conclusion of the season. Andrew Hoegl, Barrie Bernstein, Lisa Shannon, Pam Healy and Andy Cohen are recognized as the series' executive producers; it is produced by Ricochet and is distributed by Shed Media.

Cast and synopsis
Six of the seven wives featured in the third season returned for the fourth instalment.
Bethenny Frankel departed the series shortly after season 3. Frankel had expressed desires of departing the series prior to its conclusion due to not wanting to film two shows at once. Frankel had been starring in the first spin-off to The Real Housewives of New York, titled Bethenny Getting Married?. Shortly after the conclusion of season three, Frankel had announced her departure from the franchise due to the negativity saying "last season was scary and painful. It took all the joy out of it." Although Frankel had departed the series after season three, she returned to the series in full capacity in season seven and continued to star in season eight despite her claims of quitting reality television for her talk show Bethenny.
Also departing the series was season three's recurring cast member Jennifer Gilbert. Gilbert exited the series claiming that she was too normal for the series and as it progressed saying "I'm probably not the right fit."

Season four saw the introduction of a new wife, Cindy Barshop, to fill Frankel's place. Barshop is a hair removal guru, often described as the "wax queen of New York," and is also a happy single mother of twins. The Vice President of Bravo, Christian Barcellos, described Barshop as a "very successful, entrepreneurial, self-made woman," as well as saying Barshop is "the epitome of the go-go New Yorker who lives downtown in an absolutely fabulous West Village loft."

Barshop begins the season hosting an art party, with Ramona Singer being invited by Barshop she brings all the other ladies. Barshop and Singer's friendship is soon tainted after Barshop finds out from her brother that Singer has offended his girlfriend. Barshop confronts Singer on her issues at her birthday at a horse farm in Quogue but Singer is more concerned that there is no pinot grigio. Singer tries to confront Barshop's brother on the issue, but Barshop hears the conversation and shuts Singer down. The two of them are left wondering if they want to continue their friendship.
Singer hosts a party for the launch of her wine, but with Jill Zarin in attendance drama erupts after Singer addresses concern of Zarin talking about her behind her back. Singer hears some news from a fortune teller in Morocco, which leaves the rest of the ladies feeling unsettled. Later in Morocco, Singer and Zarin decided to chat about their tension as of late but leads to an all out explosion between the two, ending their friendship.
Jill Zarin returns to New York after a trip to Australia with a new outlook of staying out of the gossip, but it doesn't last long when she attends lunch with some of the housewives. Zarin focuses on business with very own shapewear line. During a party Barshop is hosting, Zarin is approached by McCord husband Simon to address their issues. Zarin, Bensimon, de Lesseps discuss Simon's Twitter activity that they deem to be cyber-bullying. Bensimon informs McCord that she and her husband are odd and creepy and she needs to control her husband her she just may be iced out from the group.
Alex McCord invites the ladies to walk in a gay marriage equality march by MENY across the Brooklyn Bridge, which her husband Simon will be speaking at. A few of the ladies gather at Sonja Morgan's house prior to the march to get dressed in their wedding dresses. McCord is excited because she's on the committee and Morgan is nervous because she's the Grand Marshall. Drama ensues at the march after McCord is informed Morgan has spoken to those in charge to prevent Simon from speaking.
Tensions run high at a party Morgan hosts, which leads to Morgan kicking McCord out of her home.
McCord begins a new career path as a model.
Kelly Bensimon and Singer's relationship remains strained from the season prior but Morgan is determined to mend the two's broken relationship.
Morgan feels betrayed by Barshop after Barshop breaks Morgan's confidence and later has Barshop at her house to lecture her on the pecking order in New York and the importance of attending to Singer's needs. The drama between to worsen when Morgan invites Barshop to her home for a second time, but Barshop takes a business call in the middle of the kitchen during breakfast. Morgan's bankruptcy becomes the talk of the town which leaves the other ladies, especially Zarin, wanting to know all the details. To get her life back on track Morgan hires a Feng Shui expert. Morgan later throws a party where she performs a burlesque number for the other ladies.
LuAnn de Lesseps continues to enjoy her relationship with her wine exporter boyfriend, Jacques. De Lesseps feels a trip away will do the ladies some good so she hosts a vacation to Morocco. In Morocco, de Lesseps is offended when she catches Morgan and Singer attempting to sneak of the property. De Lesseps reprimands Singer on her poor behavior and McCord feels it's her duty to defend Singer. McCord storms in on de Lesseps, Bensimon and Barshop to tell de Lesseps off, however her awkward entrance leaves the ladies dismissing her before she can get a word out. De Lesseps and Singer plan sweet sixteen parties for their daughters but it's clear the two have very different ideas in mind. De Lesseps records another song, "Chic C’est La Vie" and invites Zarin to the studio to listen where her producer suggests a music video. De Lesseps heads to shoot her music video and has invited the other ladies to attend. De Lesseps later hosts a party for her and Jacques 1-year anniversary, all the wives attend along with Natalie Cole who accepts the offer to sing. At the party Singer reveals she'd be elated to have another child and to everyone's surprise she has brought a pregnancy test.

Reunion Seating Arrangement

Episodes
<onlyinclude>{{Episode table
|caption=The Real Housewives of New York City season 4 episodes
| show_caption = y
|background=#55575F |overall= |season= |title= |airdate= |viewers= |country=U.S. |episodes=

{{Episode list/sublist|The Real Housewives of New York City (season 4)
 |EpisodeNumber   = 48
 |EpisodeNumber2  = 6
 |Title           = The Mask Has Two Faces
 |OriginalAirDate = 
 |ShortSummary    = Sonja throws a masquerade ball. Jill joins Cindy on a trip to the dentist. Ramona hosts a party for the launch of her wine.
 |Viewers         = 1.79<ref>{{cite web|last=Gorman|first=Bill|title=Thursday Cable Ratings: NBA & 'Swamp People' Top Night + 'America's Best Dance Crew,Real Housewives of NYC' & More|url=http://tvbythenumbers.zap2it.com/2011/05/16/thursday-cable-ratings-nba-swamp-people-top-night-americas-best-dance-crewreal-housewives-of-nyc-more/92464/|archive-url=https://web.archive.org/web/20110519214805/http://tvbythenumbers.zap2it.com/2011/05/16/thursday-cable-ratings-nba-swamp-people-top-night-americas-best-dance-crewreal-housewives-of-nyc-more/92464/|url-status=dead|archive-date=May 19, 2011|work=TV by the Numbers|date=May 16, 2011|accessdate=April 18, 2015}}</ref>
 |LineColor       = 55575F
}}

}}</onlyinclude>

DVD releases
The fourth season was released on DVD by Bravo Media on December 6, 2011. The box set features all 16 episodes plus the 2 heated reunion specials on 5 DVD discs. The fourth season is also part of The Real Housewives of New York - Complete Series'' a 47 disc box set that includes season 1 - 9 and that was released on November 17, 2017. The fourth season has never been released on Blu-ray.

References

External links

 

2011 American television seasons
New York City (season 4)